Hornos Island is a Chilean island at the southern tip of South America. The island is mostly known for being the location of Cape Horn. It is generally considered South America's southernmost island, but the Diego Ramírez Islands are farther south. The island is one of the Hermite Islands, part of the Tierra del Fuego archipelago.

The Chilean Navy maintains a station on the island, consisting of a residence, utility building, chapel, and lighthouse. A short distance from the main station is a memorial, including a large sculpture featuring the silhouette of an albatross, in honour of the sailors who died while attempting to "round the Horn".

The island is within the Cabo de Hornos National Park.

Ecology
The island is dominated by Megallanic moorlands. Exposed locations are dominated by bunch grasses and short shrubs, low to the ground to avoid wind. Short trees found only in wind protected areas. The world's southernmost tree, a Nothofagus betuloides, is found on Hornos Island. 

The island has extensive penguin colonies along the coast, with no land predators present.

People

In 2019, the island had a population of five, consisting of the lighthouse keeper, his wife, and their three children. 

The island is also the southernmost extension of pre-industrial humanity. The world's southernmost archaeological site, consisting of harpoon points, butchered bones, and a hearth or cooking camp, was found in 2019.

Geology
The composition of the island is mainly of Cretaceous granite with Jurassic volcanic rocks in the northwest. The lower areas of the island are filled with peat moss.

Climate

 Mean temperature: 5.3 °C (41.54 °F)
 Maximum temperature: 20.5 °C (68.9 °F) (February 1996)
 Minimum temperature: −14.5 °C (5.9 °F) (June 1992)
 Mean relative humidity: 86.4%
 Mean wind direction: 264°
 Mean wind speed: 84 knots
 Maximum wind speed: 119 knots (August 1995)
 Rainfall (yearly mean): 697.5 mm
 Maximum rainfall: 1263.2 mm (1990)

References 

Islands of Tierra del Fuego
Lighthouses in Chile
Hermite Islands